Mount Wake is a  mountain summit located in the Alaska Range, in Denali National Park and Preserve, in Alaska, United States. The nearest higher neighbor is Mount Dickey,  to the north. Despite its relatively low elevation, it is notable for its north face with over 4,000 feet of vertical sheer granite. The mountain was named by famed explorer Dr. Frederick Cook for his friend Charles Wake.

Climate

Based on the Köppen climate classification, Mount Wake is located in a subarctic climate zone with long, cold, snowy winters, and cool summers. Winter temperatures can drop below −20 °F with wind chill factors below −30 °F. The months May through June offer the most favorable weather for viewing and climbing.

See also
 
Mountain peaks of Alaska
Geology of Alaska

Gallery

References

External links
 Incidents: American Alpine Journal
 NOAA weather: Talkeetna
 Localized weather: Mountain Forecast

Alaska Range
Mountains of Matanuska-Susitna Borough, Alaska
Mountains of Denali National Park and Preserve
Mountains of Alaska
North American 2000 m summits